The 1995 West Virginia Mountaineers football team represented West Virginia University in the 1995 NCAA Division I-A football season. It was the Mountaineers' 103rd overall and 5th season as a member of the Big East Conference (Big East). The team was led by head coach Don Nehlen, in his 16th year, and played their home games at Mountaineer Field in Morgantown, West Virginia. They finished the season with a record of five wins and six losses (5–6 overall, 4–3 in the Big East).

Schedule

Roster

Game summaries

Purdue

Temple

Maryland

Kent State

East Carolina

Boston College

Syracuse

Virginia Tech

Rutgers

Miami (FL)

Pitt

References

West Virginia
West Virginia Mountaineers football seasons
West Virginia Mountaineers football